Ash Grove is an unincorporated community in Davis County, in the U.S. state of Iowa.

History
The community's population was 45 in 1890, 56 in 1900, and 55 in 1920.

References

Unincorporated communities in Davis County, Iowa
Unincorporated communities in Iowa